Cognac (Saintongese: Cougnat) is a commune in the Charente department, southwestern France. Administratively, the commune of Cognac is a subprefecture of the Charente department.

Name

The name is believed to be formed from individual masculine name -Connius, Gallic name, and the suffix -acum, which would correspond to the "domain of Connius".

History
The town of Cognac was unknown before the ninth century, when it was fortified. During the Hundred Years' War, the town continually changed sides, according to the tides of war. In 1526, it lent its name to the War of the League of Cognac, the military alliance established by King Francis I of France   to fight against the House of Habsburg. As a benefit of the War League of Cognac, King Francis I granted to the town of Cognac the commercial right to participate in the salt trade conducted along the river, from which regional Cognac developed into a centre for the production of wine and brandy.

In November 1651, Cognac was besieged by rebels led by Prince de Condé during the 1648-1653 civil war, the "Fronde"; and the town was relieved in December by a force under Comte d'Harcourt; afterwards, King Louis XIV granted Cognac additional commercial rights.

Cognac was part of the historic French province of Angoumois. In 1790, following the French Revolution that began the year before, the provinces were abolished and Angoumois became part of the newly created department of Charente.

Geography
Cognac is situated on the river Charente between the towns of Angoulême and Saintes. The majority of the town has been built on the river's left bank, with the smaller right bank area known as the Saint Jacques district. The town is situated on one of the pilgrimage routes to Santiago de Compostela and is home to the French Air Force training base 709.

Cognac brandy

The town gives its name to one of the world's best-known types of brandy or eau de vie. Drinks must be made in certain areas around the town of Cognac and must be made according to strictly defined regulations to be granted the name Cognac.

Cognac is a unique spirit in that it is double-distilled. This process can be viewed in one of the many "Grande Marque" Cognac houses which all have visitor centres. Most central in the town are Hennessy, Martell, Otard, Camus and Remy Martin.

There are six vineyard areas around the Cognac area, all of which are within the Appellation Controlee for Cognac, but which are considered to vary in quality from the best growth area of "Grande Champagne" (nothing to do with the Champagne wine region in NE France), through "Petite Champagne" then "Borderies", "Fins Bois", "Bon Bois" and finally "Bois Ordinaire".  The best Cognacs are generally only made using Grande and Petite Champagne grapes, but all Cognac is produced by blending a variety of eau de vie which can be made from grapes from different locations, and from different vintages.  It is the cellar master's skill that ensures that a brand's Cognac is recognizable regardless of when it is produced, since he can blend multiple eaux de vie to achieve the right taste for his house.

Different qualities of Cognac are produced by all brands, and include VS ("Very Special"); VSOP ("Very Superior [or, more commonly, "Special", though the Bureau National Interprofessionnel du Cognac specifies "Superior"] Old Pale") and XO ("eXtra Old").  (English terms are still used, since in the early days of Cognac production it was the British who were the main consumers and also became some of the main producers of Cognac, using techniques acquired from the distillation of whisky, etc.)  These are controlled by the length of time the Cognac is allowed to mature in oak barrels, a minimum time being required at each grade level.  The longer the Cognac matures in the barrel the smoother it will generally become.  Once it is bottled no further development takes place.  Most houses still have barrels of Cognac dating back to the 19th century sitting in their cellars waiting for fine blending by the Cellar Master.

Climate

Population

The inhabitants of the town are known in French as Cognaçais.

Landmarks
 The Old Town. The town's medieval quarter "Vieux Cognac" runs from the Tours Saint-Jacques, alongside the river, up to the Saint-Léger church. The area contains many unusual buildings, built between the 15th and 18th centuries, situated on narrow cobbled streets. Many contain sculptures of the salamander, the symbol of King François I, as well as gargoyles and richly decorated façades.
 The Château des Valois, an important medieval trading post.
 The Saint-Léger church. Church Exterior
 The musée d'Art et d'Histoire (art and history museum)
 The musée des arts du Cognac (art museum)
 The Saint-Gobain glassworks and barrelworks
 Cognac Public Garden

Notable people
 The glassmaker Claude Boucher, inventor of the glass-blowing machine in around 1880, lived and worked in Cognac
 The car manufacturer Louis Delâge was born in Cognac in 1874
 Francis I (king of France between 1515 and 1547) was born in the town's castle in 1494. The town's main square is named after him and a statue of the king, on horseback over his enemies, stands at the centre.
 Paul-Emile Lecoq de Boisbaudran, born in Cognac in 1838, discovered the elements Gallium in 1875 and Samarium in 1878
 Jean Monnet, one of the founding fathers of the European Union, was born in Cognac in 1888 and ran the Monnet Cognac family-controlled enterprise in the 1920s
 The French adult film star and model François Sagat was born in Cognac.
 The French poet Octavien de Saint-Gelais was born in Cognac in 1468

Sport
 US Cognac is the city's rugby union team.
Cognac was the start of Stage 19 in the 2007 Tour de France.

Twin towns—sister cities

Cognac is twinned with:

 Boala, Burkina Faso
 Bozhou, China
 Denison, United States
 Königswinter, Germany
 Michalovce, Slovakia
 Perth, Scotland
 Pisco, Peru
 Tovuz, Azerbaijan
 Valdepeñas, Spain
 Vyškov, Czech Republic

Gallery

See also
 The Coniacian Age of the Cretaceous Period of geological time is named for the city of Cognac
Communes of the Charente department

References

External links

 

Communes of Charente
Subprefectures in France
Angoumois
 
Charente communes articles needing translation from French Wikipedia